Trnavské mýto is an important transport junction and crossroad in Bratislava, Slovakia, in the Nové Mesto district.

Description 
The area includes a square, home to Dom odborov Istropolis on the north side and a market hall (tržnica) on the south.  In addition to the streets listed below, Trnavské mýto is crossed by tram lines from the city center heading both northeast on Vajnorská toward Vajnory and east via Miletičova toward Ružinov, as well as trolleybus lines from the east and west and bus service in all directions.

A pedestrian subway links the corners of the intersection with the tram stops, and includes several small shops.

History 
Trnavské mýto takes its name from its situation on the road connecting Bratislava to Trnava ("Trnavská") and from the toll point ("mýto"), though no tolls are collected there.

Formerly, a large marketplace was located here, but this was later moved to Miletičova ulica.

1783: Marketplace
1820: Cattle market, pub
1973: Construction of the Dom odborov office tower
1975: Underpass constructed; marketplace relocated
1981: Construction of Istropolis cultural centre

Connecting streets 
Šancová Street to the west, toward Račianske mýto
Trnavská cesta to the east, toward Trnava
Vajnorská Street to the northeast, toward Vajnory
Krížna Street to the southwest, toward the Old Town

References

Sources 

Transport in Bratislava
Squares in Bratislava
Road junctions in Slovakia